The UEFA Cup Winners' Cup (called European Cup Winners' Cup prior to 1994–95) was an association football competition contested between UEFA member associations' domestic cup winners, such as the English FA Cup champions. Hungarian manager Nándor Hidegkuti led Italian club Fiorentina to victory in the inaugural tournament in 1961. As part of UEFA's reorganisation of their cup competitions, the Cup Winners' Cup was abolished and the last final of the competition was held in 1999; Swede Sven-Göran Eriksson's Italian team Lazio triumphed over Spanish opponents, Mallorca.

Four managers have twice led their teams to victory in the tournament, Johan Cruyff, Valeri Lobanovsky, Nereo Rocco and most recently Alex Ferguson, who won the cup in 1983 with Aberdeen of Scotland and subsequently with Manchester United of England in 1991.

By year

Managers with multiple titles

By nationality
This table lists the total number of titles won by managers of each nationality.

See also
List of UEFA Cup Winners' Cup finals
UEFA Cup Winners' Cup records and statistics

References

General

Specific

External links
UEFA Cup Winners' Cup official history

Managers
Uefa Cup Winners Cup